Bathydraco is a genus of marine ray-finned fishes belonging to the family Bathydraconidae, the Antarctic dragonfishes. They are native to the Southern Ocean.

Taxonomy
Bathydraco was first described as a genus in 1878 by the German-born British ichthyologist Albert Günther as a monotypic genus with B. antarctica, which had been collected on the Callenger expedition south of Heard Island, as its type species.

Species
There are currently five recognized species in this genus:
 Bathydraco antarcticus Günther, 1878
 Bathydraco joannae H. H. DeWitt, 1985
 Bathydraco macrolepis Boulenger, 1907
 Bathydraco marri Norman, 1938 (Deep-water dragon)
 Bathydraco scotiae Dollo, 1906

References

Bathydraconidae
Fish of Antarctica
Taxa named by Albert Günther